The 57th Oregon Legislative Assembly convened for its regular session from January 8 to July 6, 1973. There was also a special session from January 24 to February 24, 1974.

Both houses were controlled by the Democratic Party of Oregon. The House speaker was Richard Eymann. Jason Boe was the Senate president; Eymann would serve as Speaker only during the 57th legislature; Boe would continue as President through the 1980 special session.

Republican Tom McCall was governor during the 57th legislature.

The 57th legislature passed sweeping legislation, most notably Senate Bill 100, which established a framework for land use planning in the state.

Bill McCoy, the first African American elected to Oregon's legislature, served his first term in the House during this session. He was later elected to the Oregon Senate.

See also 
 List of Oregon ballot measures#1973

References

External links 
 https://openlibrary.org/b/OL5027059M/Report-to-the-57th-Legislative-Assembly.

Oregon legislative sessions
1973 in Oregon
1974 in Oregon
1973 U.S. legislative sessions
1974 U.S. legislative sessions